Szilveszter Hangya (born 2 January 1994) is a Hungarian football player who plays for Fehérvár.

International career
In November 2016 Hangya received his first call-up to the senior Hungary squad for matches against Andorra and Sweden.

Club statistics

Updated to games played as of 15 May 2022.

References

External links
Profile at HLSZ 
Profile at MLSZ 

1994 births
People from Baja, Hungary
Sportspeople from Bács-Kiskun County
21st-century Hungarian people
Living people
Hungarian footballers
Hungary youth international footballers
Hungary under-21 international footballers
Hungary international footballers
Association football midfielders
MTK Budapest FC players
Dunaújváros PASE players
Vasas SC players
Fehérvár FC players
Nemzeti Bajnokság I players